Močilnik Springs is the best-known source of the Ljubljanica River.

Name
The name Močilnik is derived from the Slovene common noun močilnik '(hidden) spring', synonymous with the related word močilo, both derived from the Slavic root *mak- 'wet, damp'.

Geography

The springs are located at the end of the Močilnik Valley, a steephead valley 180 m long near Vrhnika. Big Močilnik Spring is found in a pond below the cliffs, and Little Močilnik Spring, with a smaller flow, lies 50 m further north. They join together to form the Little Ljubljanica River, which joins the Big Ljubljanica River after about 1 km, forming the Ljubljanica. The water that surfaces at Močilnik Springs seeps into the ground at the Planina Karst Field and Logatec Karst Field. Not far from Močilnik Springs is Furlan Hot Springs. It has a constant temperature of about 20 °C.

Cultural references

There is a plaque in the valley next to Big Močilnik Spring with a quotation from Ivan Cankar's story "Brlinčkov Miha in Tičkov Grega" (Miha from the Brlinček Farm and Grega from the Tiček Farm), describing the spring.

References

External links

Močilnik Springs on Geopedia

Municipality of Vrhnika
Springs of Slovenia
Karst springs